This is a list of people awarded the title Hero of the Soviet Union who were either listed as Jewish on their internal passports or born to a Jewish mother.

 Shetiel Abramov
 Abram Abramovich ru
 Abrek Barsht
 Yefim Belinsky ru
 Yevel Belyavin ru
 Leonid Berdichevsky ru
 Yefim Berezovsky ru
 Izrail Beskin ru
 Yevgeny Birbraer ru
 Aleksandr Bluvshtein ru
 Samuil Bogorad ru
 Nikolai Brozgol ru
 Leonid Buber ru
 Iosif Bumagin ru
 Iosif Chaykovsky ru
 Yakov Chapichev ru
 Milya Felzenshtein ru
 Israel Fisanovich
 Yakov Forzun ru
 Yefim Fradkov ru
 Mark Gallay ru
 Grigory Gardeman ru
 Grigory Garfunkin ru
 Polina Gelman 
 Semyon Gelferg ru
 Lev Gitman ru
 Grigory Gonchar ru
 Haskel Gopnik ru
 Zinovy Gorelik ru
 Solomon Gorelik ru
 Emmanuil Gotlib ru
 Genrikh Gofman ru
 Mikhail Grabsky
 Semyon Gurvich ru
 Mikhail Gurevich ru
 Isaak Dvukhbabny ru
 Grigory Dernovsky ru
 Yuri Dolzhansky ru
 David Dragunsky (twice)
 Semyon Drizovsky ru
 Yefim Dyskin ru
 Isay Illazarov ru
 Yuliush Hinber ru
 Isay Kazinets ru
 Lazar Kaplan ru
 Arkady Kaplunov
 Ilya Katunin ru
 Vladimir Khalo ru
 Viktor Khasin ru
 Volf Khatskevich ru
 Semyon Kheyfets ru
 Boris Khigrin ru
 Moisey Khokhlov ru
 Vladimir Konovalov
 Zinovy Kontsevoy ru
 Shik Koronsky ru
 Volf Korsunsky ru
 Leonty Kotlyar ru
 Boris Kotlyarsky ru
 Vladimir Kolpakchi
 Mordukh Kravets ru
 Haim Krasnokutsky ru
 Yakov Kreizer
 Simon Kremer ru
 Semyon Krivoshein
 Ilya Krichevsky ru
 David Kudryavitsky ru
 Tsezar Kunikov
 Izrail Kupershtein ru
 Boris Lev ru
 Yefim Lev ru
 Rafail Lev ru
 Boris Levin ru
 Semyon Levin ru
 Vladimir Levitan ru
 Aleksandr Letuchy ru
 Mikhail Libman ru
 Boris Lunts ru
 Iosif Makovsky ru
 Lev Manevich ru
 David Margulis ru
 Lev Margulyan ru
 Moisey Maryanovsky ru
 Shabsa Mashkautsan ru
 Grigory Mats ru
 Yefim Melakh ru
 Dmitry Medvedev
 Rafail Milner ru
 Nikolai Molochnikov ru
 Mikhail Nepinnyashchy ru
 Aleksandr Orlikov ru
 Mikhail Ocheret ru
 Rafail Pavlovsky ru
 Mikhail Pavlotsky ru
 Lazar Papernik ru
 Naum Pausakhovsky ru
 Mikhail Plotkin ru
 Natan Polyusuk ru
 Grigory Provanov ru
 Vladimir Prygov ru
 Maksim Rapeyko ru
 Boris Rivkin ru
 Veniamin Ruvinsky ru
 Abram Saposhnikov ru
 Abram Sverdlov ru
 Semyon Selsky ru
 Iosif Serper ru
 Idel Shandalov ru
 Valentin Shapiro ru
 Moisey Shakhnovich ru
 Moisey Shvartsman ru
 Mark Shevelov ru
 Aron Shinder ru
 Mikhail Shneyderman ru
 Grigory Shtern
 Kalmanis Shuras ru
 Abram Smolyakov ru
 Yakov Smushkevich (twice)
 Rudolf Sokolinsky ru
 Moisey Spivak ru
 Yefim Sterin ru
 Natan Stratievsky ru
 Pyotr Tavrovsky ru
 Abram Temnik ru
 Boris Tsindelis ru
 Yefim Tsitovsky ru
 Pinkhus Turyan
 Grigory Ushpolis ru
 Yevsei Vainrub
 Matvei Vainrub
 Boris Vaunshtein ru
 Vladimir Vaiser ru
 Isaak Vaksman ru
 Mikhail Valyansky ru
 Yakov Vernikov
 Volfas Vilenskis ru
 Grigory Vinogradov ru
 Zalman Vikhnin ru
 Boris Volynov (twice)
 Girsh Yudashkin ru
 Iosif Yufa ru
 Izrail Yakubovsky ru
 Naum Zholudev ru
 Abram Zindels ru
 Yefim Zlatin ru

References 

 
 Russian Ministry of Defence Database «Подвиг Народа в Великой Отечественной войне 1941—1945 гг.» [Feat of the People in the Great Patriotic War 1941-1945] (in Russian).

Heroes of the Soviet Union lists